Jacob Lesuuda is a Kenyan Anglican bishop: he is the current Bishop of Maralal.

His daughter Naisula is a senator in Kenya.

References

Living people
21st-century Anglican bishops of the Anglican Church of Kenya
Anglican bishops of Maralal
Year of birth missing (living people)